Monique Marie Matthews ( Burkland, born August 11, 1989) is an American Paralympic volleyballist.

Early life
Burkland was born in Reno, Nevada. She graduated from Plainview High School in 2008 where she used to be all-state softball player. There, she also did track and basketball. While being employed on a summer job, she lost her leg in a forklift accident. Since then, she has joined the USA sitting volleyball team and trains at the University of Central Oklahoma. On May 2, 2016, she married her boyfriend of almost five years Landon Matthews in Oklahoma City.

Career
She started competing for Paralympic Games in 2010 where she won a silver medal for her participation at World Organization Volleyball for Disabled. In 2011 and 2012 respectively she won three gold medals at ECVD Continental Cup which was held in Yevpatoria, Ukraine, Parapan American Zonal Championship of São Paulo, Brazil and Volleyball Masters. She won a silver medal at the 2012 Paralympic Games in London.

She was a member of the USA Paralympic women's volleyball team which won the gold medal at the 2015 Parapan American Games in Toronto, at the 2016 Summer Paralympics in Rio de Janeiro, and at the 2020 Summer Paralympics in Tokyo.

References

External links
 
 Monique (Burkland) Matthews at USA Volleyball
 
 
 

1989 births
Living people
American sitting volleyball players
Women's sitting volleyball players
Paralympic volleyball players of the United States
Paralympic gold medalists for the United States
Paralympic silver medalists for the United States
Paralympic medalists in volleyball
Volleyball players at the 2012 Summer Paralympics
Volleyball players at the 2016 Summer Paralympics
Volleyball players at the 2020 Summer Paralympics
Medalists at the 2012 Summer Paralympics
Medalists at the 2016 Summer Paralympics
Medalists at the 2020 Summer Paralympics
Sportspeople from Reno, Nevada